We'll Stick Together is an album of duets between Kitty Wells and her husband Johnny Wright. It was released in 1968 on the Decca label (DL 5026). The Jordanaires provided backup vocals and music.

Track listing
Side A
 "We'll Stick Together" (Bill Phillips) [2:34]
 "We Must of Been Out of Our Minds" (Melba Montgomery) [2:22]
 "One by One" (Jack Anglin, Jim Anglin, Johnny Wright) [2:47]
 "Happiness Means You" (Jim Anglin) [2:18]
 "Living as Strangers" (Bill Phillips, Jean Stromatt) [2:58]
 "I Can't Stop Loving You" (Don Gibson) [2:18]

Side B
 "Holding On to Nothing" (Jerry Chestnut) [2:18]
 "Heartbreak Waltz" (Johnny Wright, Rusty Gabbard] (2:03]
 "Ashes of Love" (Jack Anglin, Jim Anglin, Johnny Wright) [1:57]
 "You and Me" (Jack Anglin, Jim Anglin, Johnny Wright) [2:40]
 "My Elusive Dreams" (Billy Sherrill, Curly Putman) [2:39]

References

1968 albums
Kitty Wells albums
Vocal duet albums